The 2016-17 Turkish Women's Basketball League is the 37th edition of the top-flight professional women's basketball league in Turkey.

Tosyalı Toyo Osmaniye and MBK Doğuş Hastanesi promoted to Turkish Women's Basketball League after 2015-2016 season.

On June 10 İstanbul BGD and Yakın Doğu Üniversitesi have merged and it will compete as Yakın Doğu Üniversitesi. Girne Üniversitesi took the spot of the Yakın Doğu Üniversitesi.

Regular season

League table

Results

Play-off

References

External links 
Official Site

Turkish Women's Basketball League seasons
Women
Turkey